Zuwarah Airport  is an airport serving the Mediterranean coastal city of Zuwarah in Libya.

The Zwara non-directional beacon (Ident: ZAR) is located on the field.

See also
Transport in Libya
List of airports in Libya

References

External links
 OpenStreetMap - Zwara
 OurAirports - Zwara Airport
 
 Google Earth

Airports in Libya